Mårslet is a railway town in Denmark, located about  south of Aarhus. It has a population of 5,004 (1 January 2022). Mårslet is located in Aarhus Municipality and therefore is part of the Central Denmark Region.

Mårslet is situated on the historical Odderbanen, the railway line between Odder and Aarhus, and the resulting short journey time to these urban centres has been an important factor in the town's development since the opening of the line in 1884. Mårslet has seen especially rapid housing development and population growth in recent years.

Overview

Mårslet is one of the areas in East Jutland with the highest average household income. In recent times, Mårslet has experienced a strong growth of new houses, especially due to an increased relocation of affluent people from Aarhus. Among the reasons for the large population growth are the surrounding nature and easy options of transportation to the central Aarhus C, but the growth has also caused traffic problems with heavy traffic through the city center during rush hour. Most forms of housing are represented in Mårslet.

Travelling to inner city Aarhus by Bus 16 from Busselskabet Aarhus Sporveje takes 30 minutes, and the trip with Aarhus Letbane (light rail) around 25 m.

History
In the earliest sources, the place is referred to as "Mordslet".

As a village, it experienced its first period of rapid growth after the construction of the Hads-Ning Herreders Line (Odderbanen) between Aarhus and Odder in 1884.

Until the 1970 Danish Municipal Reform, Mårslet was an independent parish.

Culture and sports
Mårslet Fællesråd ("Mårslet Joint Council") is an umbrella organisation for all associations in the city. The joint council works to maintain, promote and coordinate the interests of the local area, both internally in the town and externally in relation to public authorities, especially Aarhus Municipality. The joint council is also maintaining the town's website, maarslet.net.

Mårslet's sports club is called TMG, which stands for Testrup Mårslet Gymnastikforening. The club has departments for association football, handball, gymnastics, basketball, volleyball, badminton, tennis, darts, pétanque and general exercise (gym, running school, cycling exercise). In 2007 and 2016, the club's senior football team achieved its greatest successes ever since its founding in 1868. In 2007, the club's first team (located in the lowest-tier Series 6) won the JBU Cup as the lowest ranked team in the history of the tournament. In 2016, after two promotions in a row, the first team reached the Series 2, the seventh-tier of Danish football.

Mårslet-Bladet is a local magazine that is published every month, except in August and February, for residents of Mårslet. The local magazine, which is produced on a voluntary basis, contains material from Mårslet Fællesråd, Mårslet Skole (the local school), the sports club TMG and the local church.

Noted residents
Notable current and former residents of Mårslet include:
 Mads Larsen (born 1973), professional super middleweight boxer. One of Denmark's finest boxers
 Michelle Brandstrup (born 1987 in Mårslet) a Danish handball player who plays for Ringkøbing Håndbold

References 
Bibliography
 
 

Notes

Towns and settlements in Aarhus Municipality
Cities and towns in the Central Denmark Region
Cities and towns in Aarhus Municipality